A statue of Paschal Baylón (sometimes called San Pascual Bailón) is a sculpture by Ramiz Barquet, installed along Puerto Vallarta's Malecón, in the Mexican state of Jalisco.

References

External links

 

Centro, Puerto Vallarta
Monuments and memorials in Jalisco
Outdoor sculptures in Puerto Vallarta
Sculptures of men in Mexico
Statues in Jalisco